Ethan Iverson (born February 11, 1973) is a pianist, composer, and critic best known for his work in the avant-garde jazz trio The Bad Plus with bassist Reid Anderson and drummer Dave King.

Biography 
Iverson was born in Menomonie, Wisconsin. Before forming The Bad Plus, he was musical director of the Mark Morris Dance Group and a student of Fred Hersch and Sophia Rosoff. He has worked with artists such as Billy Hart, Kurt Rosenwinkel, Tim Berne, Mark Turner, Ben Street, Lee Konitz, Albert "Tootie" Heath, Paul Motian, Larry Grenadier, Charlie Haden and Ron Carter. He currently studies with John Bloomfield and is on the faculty of the New England Conservatory.

In 2017, the Bad Plus announced that Iverson was leaving the group, to be replaced by Orrin Evans. Also in 2017, the Mark Morris Dance Group premiered Pepperland, for which Iverson composed the score (derived from parts of the Beatles' Sgt. Pepper's Lonely Hearts Club Band) and led the band during performances.

In 2018, Iverson premiered his Concerto to Scale with the American Composers Orchestra; released the album Temporary Kings with saxophonist Mark Turner on the ECM label; and toured Europe with the Billy Hart Quartet.

In 2019, Iverson and trumpeter Tom Harrell released the album Common Practice, recorded at the Village Vanguard, on ECM. Iverson also served as an artistic director of the 2019 Jazz te Gast festival in the Netherlands, at which his orchestral piece Solve for X premiered.

In 2021, Iverson's album Bud Powell in the 21st Century, featuring Ingrid Jensen, Dayna Stephens, Ben Street, Lewis Nash, and the Umbria Jazz Orchestra, was released on Sunnyside Records.

2022 saw the release of Iverson's first record for Blue Note, "Every Note is True", with Larry Grenadier and Jack DeJohnette. The album contains mostly Iverson originals for trio, plus DeJohnette's "Blue" and Iverson's song "The More It Changes" for 44-person socially distanced choir.

Iverson also writes about music and music-related topics and has been published by The New Yorker, NPR, and The Nation.

Discography

As leader

With The Bad Plus
 The Bad Plus (2001)
 Authorized Bootleg: New York 12/16/01 (2002)
 These Are the Vistas (2003)
 Give (2004)
 Blunt Object: Live in Tokyo (1999)
 Suspicious Activity? (2005)
 Prog (2007)
 For All I Care (2008 Europe, 2009 North America)
 Never Stop (2010)
 Made Possible (2012)
 The Rite of Spring (2014)
 Inevitable Western (2014)
 The Bad Plus Joshua Redman (2015)
 It's Hard (2016)

As sideman
With Albert Heath
 Live at Small's (SmallsLive, 2010)
 Tootie's Tempo (Sunnyside, 2013)
 Philadelphia Beat (Sunnyside, 2015)

With Billy Hart
 Billy Hart Quartet (HighNote, 2006)
 All Our Reasons (ECM 2012)
 One Is the Other (ECM, 2014)

With Buffalo Collision (incl. Tim Berne, Hank Roberts, David King)
 Duck (2008)

With Chris Cheek, Ben Street, and Jorge Rossy
 Live at the Jamboree: Guilty (Fresh Sound, 2002)
 Live at the Jamboree: Lazy Afternoon (Fresh Sound, 2002)With Avantango (Thomas Chapin and Pablo Aslan)
 Y en el 2000 Tambien... (EPSA Music, Argentina)With Patrick Zimmerli' Twelve Sacred Dances (1998)
 Clockworks'' (2018)

Personal life
Iverson lives in Brooklyn, New York, with his wife, the writer Sarah Deming.

References

External links
 Official site
 

Living people
1973 births
American male pianists
21st-century American pianists
21st-century American male musicians
The Bad Plus members
Fresh Sounds Records artists
HighNote Records artists
Criss Cross Jazz artists
ECM Records artists